Blood purity, and related terms pureblood, pureblooded, full-blooded, full-blood, full blood, half blood and half-blooded, are all terms which are or have been used relating to racial purity. It may also be associated with:
 Blood quantum laws, tribal laws in the United States stipulating a certain minimum degree of indigenous and/or tribal ancestry required for membership in a given Native American tribe
 The term Half-caste, and in particular with reference to laws known as
Half-Caste Act in some states of Australia
 Limpieza de sangre, blood purity laws in Medieval Spain stipulating a social hierarchy based on ancestry

Blood purity may also refer to:
 Purity of wizarding ancestry in the fictional Harry Potter series

See also
 Blood (disambiguation)
 Casta
 Full Blooded, an American rapper
 German Blood Certificate
 Purity (disambiguation)
 Purebred
 Pedigree chart